The Taipei Futai Street Mansion, also called , is the only existing historical and commercial building in Taipei, Taiwan. It is located at Yanping South Road No.26, Zhongzheng District and lies in the Bo'ai Special Zone as well. This mansion is owned by the Ministry of National Defense.

History
The building was constructed in 1910 the early years of the Japanese rule. It was the head office of Takaishi Gumi, a construction company founded in 1901.

Architecture
The mansion architectural style was deeply influenced by the European baroque classical fashion at the time. The first floor arcades and columns was constructed by the kizingan stone, and the second floor has the most obvious external characteristics of the steep angular mansard roof with dormers.

Transportation
The mansion is accessible by Taipei Metro. From Taipei Main Station, leave by Exit Z10 of the Station Front Metro Mall, or take Exit 6 from the Ximen Metro Mall at Ximen Station and walk 15 minutes to Yanping South Road.

Opening time
Taipei Futai Street Mansion is open to the public from Monday to Saturday 10:00 ~18:00 (Closed Sundays). Admission fee generally is free except special exhibition.

See also
 Taiwan under Japanese rule

References

External links

 

1910 establishments in Taiwan
Baroque architecture in Taipei
Buildings and structures in Taipei
Houses completed in 1910
Houses in Taiwan
Palaces in Taiwan
Tourist attractions in Taipei